Events from the year 1964 in the United Kingdom.

Incumbents
 Monarch – Elizabeth II
 Prime Minister - Alec Douglas-Home (Conservative) (until 16 October), Harold Wilson (Labour) (starting 16 October)
 Parliament
 42nd (until 25 September)
 43rd (starting 27 October)

Events

 1 January  – Top of the Pops first airs on BBC TV.
 11 January – teen girls' magazine Jackie first published.
 20 January – eleven men go on trial at Buckinghamshire Assizes in Aylesbury charged in connection with the Great Train Robbery five months ago.
 21 January – Government figures show that the average weekly wage is £16.
 22 January – film Zulu released.
 28 January – families from Springtown Camp make a silent march through Derry, Northern Ireland, to demand rehousing.
 29 January–9 February – Great Britain and Northern Ireland compete at the Winter Olympics in Innsbruck, Austria, and win one gold medal.
 6 February – the British and French governments agree a deal for the construction of a Channel Tunnel. The twin-tunneled rail link is expected to take five years to build.
 11 February – Southampton is granted city status, the first such designation of the current reign.
 19 February – actor Peter Sellers marries actress Britt Ekland.
 21 February – £10 banknotes are issued for the first time since the Second World War.
 9 March – London Fisheries Convention signed.
 10 March – the Queen gives birth to her fourth child and third son, Edward.
 19 March
 Power dispute talks break down and it is feared that supply disruptions will follow industrial action.
 The government announces plans to build three new towns in South East England to act as overspill for overpopulated London. One of these is centred on the village of Milton Keynes in north Buckinghamshire.
 26 March – verdicts are passed on ten men for their role in the Great Train Robbery after one of the longest criminal trials and longest jury retirals in English legal history.
 28 March – "pirate" radio station Radio Caroline begins regular broadcasting from a ship anchored just outside UK territorial waters off Felixstowe.
 29 March – first purpose-built gurdwara in Britain opens, the Guru Gobind Singh Ji Gurdwara in Bradford.
 30 March – violent disturbances between Mods and Rockers at Clacton beach.
 31 March – Minister of Labour Joseph Godber appoints Lord Justice Pearson to chair a court of inquiry into the power dispute.
 1 April – the Ministry of Defence takes over the duties of the War Office, Admiralty and Air Ministry, which cease to exist. The title of Lord High Admiral is re-vested in the Monarch. The Ministry of Education and Ministry of Science merge to form the Department of Education and Science.
 9 April – Labour wins the first elections to the Greater London Council.
 10 April – Runcorn, a small town in north Cheshire, is designated as a new town by Alec Douglas-Home's government. Extensive house building and industrial and commercial developments are predicted to inflate the town's population to around 70,000 by 1981.
 11 April – the National Trust reopens the southern section of the Stratford-upon-Avon Canal, the first major restoration of a canal for leisure use.
 16 April – sentence is passed on eleven men for their role in the Great Train Robbery, seven receiving 30 years each.
 18 April – Liverpool win the Football League First Division for the sixth time in their history.
 20 April
 The Queen's son's name is registered as Edward.
 The scheduled opening night of BBC Two, the UK's third television channel, is disrupted by power cuts in London, and all that can be screened is announcer Gerald Priestland delivering apologies from Alexandra Palace. On the same day, the BBC Television Service is renamed BBC One.
 21 April – BBC Two begins scheduled broadcasting; its first programme is Play School.
 29 April – all schools in Aberdeen are closed following 136 cases of typhoid being reported.
 1 May – Princess Margaret gives birth to a baby girl.
 2 May
 West Ham United win the FA Cup for the first time in their history, beating Preston North End 3–2 at Wembley Stadium.
 The Queen and Prince Philip, Duke of Edinburgh's seven-week-old son is christened Edward Antony Richard Louis – later he is created Earl of Wessex and Duke of Edinburgh.
 5 May – Granada Television broadcasts the first in what will become a series of documentary interviews, Seven Up!
 6 May – Joe Orton's black comedy Entertaining Mr Sloane premieres at the New Arts Theatre in London.
 11 May – Terence Conran opens the first Habitat store on London's Fulham Road.
 12 May – "pirate" radio station Radio Atlanta begins broadcasting from  anchored off Frinton-on-Sea; in July its operations are merged with Radio Caroline.
 15 May – Lord Justice Pearson reports on the power dispute.
 16–18 May: violent disturbances between Mods and Rockers at Brighton.
 27 May – "pirate" radio station Radio Sutch begins broadcasting from Shivering Sands Army Fort in the Thames Estuary.
 29 May – official opening of the UK's first undercover shopping centre, at the Bull Ring, Birmingham. 
 17 June – A missing persons investigation is launched in Fallowfield, Manchester, as police search for 12-year-old Keith Bennett, who was last seen on his way to his grandmother's house yesterday evening. He is a victim of the Moors murders.
 July
 Resale Prices Act ends most resale price maintenance.
 Helen Brook sets up the first Brook Advisory Centre offering teenage contraception and sexual health advice.
 6 July
 Malawi gains its independence.
 The Beatles' first film, A Hard Day's Night, is released.
 10 July – more than 300 people are injured in Liverpool when a crowd of some 150,000 people welcome the Beatles back to their home city.
 15 July – the Post Office Tower in London is completed, although it does not begin operation until October 1965.
 28 July – Winston Churchill retires from the House of Commons at the age of 89.
 4 August
 The first portable televisions go on sale.
 Release of London group The Kinks' successful single You Really Got Me, written by Ray Davies.
 13 August – Peter Anthony Allen, at Walton Prison in Liverpool and Gwynne Owen Evans, at Strangeways Prison in Manchester, are hanged for the murder of John Alan West on 7 April, the last executions to take place in the British Isles.
 22 August – the first Match of the Day airs on BBC Two television.
 September – The British Motor Corporation launches the BMC ADO17 family saloon car, initially as the Austin 1800; this again wins BMC the European Car of the Year award, in its second year.
 4 September – the Forth Road Bridge opens over the Firth of Forth, linking Fife and Edinburgh.
 14 September – the final edition of the left-wing Daily Herald newspaper is published.
 15 September
 The Sun newspaper goes into circulation, replacing the Daily Herald.
 Sir Alec Douglas-Home calls a general election for 15 October.
 17 September – Goldfinger, the third James Bond film, premieres at Odeon Leicester Square in London.
 20 September – At the autumnal equinox, the Order of Bards, Ovates and Druids (OBOD) is founded in England, as the equivalent of Wales's Gorsedd of Bards.
 21 September – Malta obtains independence from the UK.
 29 September – announcement that American car manufacturer Chrysler is taking a substantial share in the British Rootes Group combine, which includes the Hillman, Singer and Sunbeam marques.
 October – Dorothy Crowfoot Hodgkin wins the Nobel Prize in Chemistry (the first British woman to win a Nobel) "for her determinations by X-ray techniques of the structures of important biochemical substances".
 10–24 October – Great Britain competes at the Olympics in Tokyo and wins 4 gold, 12 silver and 2 bronze medals.
 15 October – the general election is held. The Labour Party defeats the Conservatives. Harold Wilson becomes Prime Minister, having gained a majority of five seats. The election result spells the end of 13 years of Conservative government, although the Prime Minister Alec Douglas-Home had entered office only 12 months ago. Among the retiring MP's is the former Prime Minister Sir Winston Churchill, who has been an MP for 63 of the last 65 years. A surprise casualty as MP is Patrick Gordon Walker who was widely expected to become the Foreign Secretary in a future Labour government; but loses his Smethwick seat to the Conservatives following a controversial racially motivated campaign by the opposing party's supporters.
 17 October – Harold Wilson's cabinet is announced; it includes James Callaghan (who missed out on the Labour leadership in February 1963), Denis Healey, Barbara Castle and Roy Jenkins. Jim Griffiths becomes the first Secretary of State for Wales.
 18 October – Wilson creates the Welsh Office.
 24 October – Northern Rhodesia, a former British protectorate, becomes the independent Republic of Zambia, ending 73 years of British rule.
 2 November – ITV soap opera Crossroads airs for the first time.
 9 November – House of Commons votes to abolish the death penalty for murder in Britain. The last execution took place in August and the death penalty is set to be officially abolished before the end of next year, with the number of executions having gradually fallen during the last decade.
 27 November – power unions announce that they will start balloting for a strike.
 30 November – power dispute settled and strike action called off.
 16 December – Government, Trades Union Congress and employers produce a joint Statement of Intent on Productivity, Prices and Incomes.
 21 December – MPs vote 355 to 170 for the abolition of the death penalty, with the abolition likely to be confirmed before the end of next year. The death penalty has gradually fallen out of use over the last twenty years, with the two most recent executions having taken place in August this year.
 23 December
 Richard Beeching announces his intention to resign as Chairman of the British Railways Board after three-and-a-half years, during which he proposed the closure of many smaller and financially non-viable railway lines as well as many passenger services on surviving lines.
 "Pirate" radio station Wonderful Radio London begins broadcasting from MV Galaxy anchored off Frinton-on-Sea, with a Fab 40 playlist of popular records.
 24 December – The Beatles gain the Christmas number one for the second year running with "I Feel Fine", which has topped the singles charts for the third week running. The Beatles have now had six number one singles in the United Kingdom alone.
 26 December – Police launch a missing persons investigation after ten-year-old Lesley Ann Downey goes missing from a fairground near her home in Ancoats, Manchester. She is a victim of the Moors murders.
 31 December – Donald Campbell sets the world speed record on water at 276.33 mph on Dumbleyung Lake in Australia.

Undated
 Hanson Trust set up by James Hanson and Gordon White to purchase underperforming companies and turn them around.
 Centre for Contemporary Cultural Studies established at the University of Birmingham by Richard Hoggart.
 Daihatsu becomes the first Japanese carmaker to import passenger cars to the United Kingdom, launching its Compagno on the British market.
 Some 90% of British households now own a television, compared to around 25% in 1953 and 65% in 1959.

Publications
 Agatha Christie's Miss Marple novel A Caribbean Mystery.
 J. W. B. Douglas's cohort study The Home and the School: a study of ability and attainment in the primary school.
 Ian Fleming's James Bond novel You Only Live Twice and his children's novel Chitty-Chitty-Bang-Bang (the latter posthumously).
 William Golding's novel The Spire.
 Philip Larkin's poetry collection The Whitsun Weddings.
 Ruth Rendell's first novel From Doon with Death.
 The research study London: aspects of change, introducing Ruth Glass's concept of gentrification.

Births
 8 January – Marc Quinn, sculptor
 13 January – Bill Bailey, comedian
 14 January – Mark Addy, actor
 18 January 
Richard Dunwoody, jockey
Jane Horrocks, actress
 29 January – John Anthony Gallagher, English-New Zealand rugby player
 5 February – Martha Fiennes, film director
 9 February – Mark Carleton-Smith, soldier, Chief of the General Staff
 16 February – Christopher Eccleston, actor
 18 February – Tommy Scott, British musician and frontman of Space
 22 February – Diane Charlemagne, singer (52nd Street, Urban Cookie Collective) (died 2015)
 25 February – Lee Evans, comedian and actor
 29 February – James Ogilvy, son of Princess Alexandra, the Honourable Lady Ogilvy and Sir Angus Ogilvy
 10 March – Prince Edward (later Earl of Wessex and Duke of Edinburgh), youngest son of the Queen
 11 March 
Emma Chambers, actress (d. 2018)
Shane Richie, actor
 17 March – Lee Dixon, English footballer
 18 March – Courtney Pine, jazz saxophonist
 19 March – Jake Weber, actor  
 27 March – Clive Rowe, actor
 26 March – Martin Donnelly, Northern Irish racing driver
 3 April – Nigel Farage, United Kingdom Independence Party leader and MEP for South East England
 4 April – Paul Parker, footballer
 13 April 
 Andy Goram, Scottish footballer (d. 2022)
 John Swinney, Scottish politician
 18 April – Niall Ferguson, Scottish historian
 20 April – Andy Serkis, English film actor
 25 April – Andy Bell, singer-songwriter (band Erasure)
 28 April – Lady Helen Taylor, daughter of the Duke and Duchess of Kent
 1 May – Lady Sarah Chatto, daughter of Antony Armstrong-Jones and Princess Margaret
 6 May – Diane Holl, engineer
 8 May – Dave Rowntree, drummer (Blur)
 11 May – John Parrott, snooker player and broadcaster
 15 May – Jill McDonald, businesswoman
 20 May 
 Charles Spencer, 9th Earl Spencer, aristocrat, author, print journalist and broadcaster, younger brother of Diana, Princess of Wales
 Mike Gregory, English rugby player and coach (d. 2007)
 21 May – Danny Bailey, English footballer 
 24 May – Adrian Moorhouse, swimmer
 30 May – Mark Sheppard, British-American actor and musician
 10 June – Ben Daniels, actor
 13 June – Kathy Burke, actress and comedian
 14 June – Peter Gilliver, lexicographer and academic
 19 June – Boris Johnson, Prime Minister of the United Kingdom from 2019 to 2022
 21 June
 Sammi Davis, actress
 Tania Mathias, ophthalmologist and Conservative Party politician
 David Morrissey, actor, director, producer and screenwriter
 Keith Stevens, English footballer
 22 June 
 Paterson Joseph, actor
 John Penrose, politician, Minister for Tourism and Heritage
 23 June – Jane Garvey, radio presenter
 24 June – Christopher Steele, intelligence officer 
 25 June – Johnny Herbert, racing driver and commentator
 3 July – Joanne Harris, novelist
 7 July – Rob Newman, comedian, actor and author
 12 July – Gaby Roslin, TV presenter 
 14 July – Matt Pritchett, pocket cartoonist
 17 July – Andy Abraham, singer 
 21 July – Ross Kemp, actor
 22 July – Bonnie Langford, actress and entertainer
 23 July
 Dom Phillips, journalist (d. 2022)
 Matilda Ziegler, actress
 3 August – Ralph Knibbs, rugby union player
 16 August – Barry Venison, English footballer and journalist
 20 August – Flaminia Cinque, actress
 22 August – Diane Setterfield, novelist and educator
 26 August – Allegra Huston, English-American author
 1 September 
 Gary Mavers, actor
 Nigel Rhodes, actor and guitarist
 8 September – Peter Murrell,  Scottish politician
 19 September – Simon Singh, popular science author
 23 September – Clayton Blackmore, footballer
 30 September – Ian McCall, Scottish footballer and manager
 1 October – Harry Hill, comedian, writer and actor
 3 October – Clive Owen, English actor
 7 October – Paul Stewart, English footballer
 8 October – Martin Marquez, English actor
 10 October – Sarah Lancashire, English actress
 21 October – Mark Sedwill, Cabinet Secretary
 22 October
Mick Hill, English javelin thrower and coach
Craig Levein, Scottish footballer
Paul McStay, Scottish footballer
 24 October 
 Grant Gee, film maker, photographer and cinematographer
 Paul Vigay, computer programmer (died 2009)
 28 October – Andrew Bridgen, politician
 29 October – Yasmin Le Bon, model 
 7 November – Philip Hollobone, Conservative politician and MP for Kettering
 19 November 
 Susie Dent, lexicographer 
 Nicholas Patrick, astronaut
 21 November   
 Sean Foley, director, writer, comedian and actor  
 Liza Tarbuck, actress and broadcaster 
 24 November – Alistair McGowan, actor and comedian
 26 November – Gary Love, actor and film director 
 7 December – Hugo Blick, filmmaker
 18 December – Robson Green, actor and television presenter
 21 December – Rob Kelly, footballer and manager 
 25 December – Gary McAllister, Scottish footballer, manager and coach
 30 December – Sophie Ward, actress
 Undated – Nitin Sawhney, British Indian musician, producer and composer

Deaths
 7 January – Cyril Davies, blues musician (born 1932)
 9 January – Hubert Phillips, economist, journalist, bridge player and composer of puzzles (born 1891)
 17 January – T. H. White, novelist (born 1906)
 20 February – Verena Holmes, mechanical engineer and inventor (born 1889)
 22 February – Verrier Elwin, anthropologist and missionary (born 1902)
 26 February – F. F. E. Yeo-Thomas, World War II hero (born 1901)
 21 March – Nancy Spain (born 1917) and Joan Werner Laurie (born 1920), journalists, in the crash of a light plane near Aintree
 9 June – Max Aitken, 1st Baron Beaverbrook, Canadian-British business tycoon, politician and writer (born 1879)
 21 July – John White, footballer (born 1937)
 12 August – Ian Fleming, author and journalist (born 1908)
 18 September – Clive Bell, art critic (born 1881)
 5 November – Mabel Lucie Attwell, illustrator (born 1879)
 1 December – J. B. S. Haldane, geneticist (born 1892)
 8 December – Simon Marks, 1st Baron Marks of Broughton, businessman (born 1888)
 9 December – Edith Sitwell, poet (born 1887)
 21 December – Algernon Kingscote, tennis champion (born 1888)
 24 December – Claudia Jones, black activist (born 1915)

See also
 1964 in British music
 1964 in British television
 List of British films of 1964

References

 
Years of the 20th century in the United Kingdom